"Alle Mädchen wollen küssen" (All girls want to kiss) is a song originally recorded by Leo Leandros, released in 1959. Other recorded versions include Peter Kraus, Bob Gerry, and Die Roten Rosen.

It has also been recorded in French as "Je suis content... je chante" by Richard Anthony, in English as "Be Mine" by both Lance Fortune and Lillian Briggs, in Spanish as "Solo para me" by Dúo Dinámico, and in Portuguese as "Seja o meu amor" by Tony Campelo.

Die Roten Rosen cover

The song was covered by Die Toten Hosen for the 1987 cover album Never Mind the Hosen, Here's Die Roten Rosen. It was released as the third single from the album, released under the alias Die Roten Rosen.

Track listing
 "Alle Mädchen wollen küssen" − 1:26
 "Liebesspieler (High-Noon-Mix)" (Love Player) (Breitkopf, Frege/Frege) − 3:28
 "Opel-Gang (Trucking-Mix)" (v. Holst, Frege/Breitkopf, Frege, v. Holst, Meurer, Trimpop) − 2:29

1987 singles
Die Toten Hosen songs
1959 songs
Songs written by Leo Leandros
Virgin Records singles